The Military ranks of Jamaica are the military insignia used by the Jamaica Defence Force. Jamaica shares a rank structure similar to that of the United Kingdom.

Commissioned officer ranks
The rank insignia of commissioned officers.

Other ranks
The rank insignia of non-commissioned officers and enlisted personnel.

Pre 2019 ranks 
Commissioned officer ranks
The rank insignia of commissioned officers.

Other ranks
The rank insignia of non-commissioned officers and enlisted personnel.

References

External links
 
 

Jamaica
Military of Jamaica